Thornhill, Eastern Cape may refer to:

Thornhill, Kouga
Thornhill, Enoch Mgijima